Tanvir Hayder Khan (born 5 December 1991) is a Bangladeshi cricketer.  He made his first senior appearances in 2010, playing in two first-class matches for Sylhet Division.  He later made his List A debut for the Bangladesh Cricket Board XI, playing against the touring England XI.

In May 2017, he took his first five-wicket haul in a List A match, playing for Sheikh Jamal in the 2016–17 Dhaka Premier Division Cricket League.

International career
In November 2016, he was named in a 22-man preparatory squad to train in Australia, ahead of Bangladesh's tour to New Zealand. In December 2016 he was named in Bangladesh's One Day International (ODI) squad for their series against New Zealand. He made his ODI debut for Bangladesh on 29 December 2016 against New Zealand.

In January 2018, he was added to Bangladesh's Test squad for their series against Sri Lanka.

References

External links
 
 

1991 births
Living people
Bangladeshi cricketers
Bangladesh One Day International cricketers
Sylhet Division cricketers
Rangpur Division cricketers
Kala Bagan Krira Chakra cricketers
Mohammedan Sporting Club cricketers
Prime Bank Cricket Club cricketers
Bangladesh North Zone cricketers
Bangladesh Central Zone cricketers
People from Rangpur District
South Asian Games gold medalists for Bangladesh
South Asian Games medalists in cricket